Kristiansund (historically spelled Christianssund and earlier named Fosna) is a municipality on the western coast of Norway in the Nordmøre district of Møre og Romsdal county. The administrative center of the municipality is the town of Kristiansund (established in 1742), which is the major town for the whole Nordmøre region. Other notable settlements in the municipality include the villages of Kvalvåg, Rensvik, and Nedre Frei.

The  municipality is the 333rd largest by area out of the 356 municipalities in Norway. Kristiansund is the 52nd most populous municipality in Norway with a population of 24,013.

General information
The parish of Christianssund was established as a municipality on 1 January 1838 (see formannskapsdistrikt law). Initially, the small island municipality included just the town of Christianssund and its immediate surrounding area. During the 1960s, there were many municipal mergers across Norway due to the work of the Schei Committee. On 1 January 1964, Kristiansund Municipality was merged with the tiny Grip Municipality (population: 104) to the northwest and the Dale area of Bremsnes Municipality on Nordlandet island (population: 963). The neighboring Frei Municipality was merged with Kristiansund on 1 January 2008 creating a much larger Kristiansund Municipality.

Toponymy
The municipality is named after the town of Kristiansund. Historically, it was spelled Christianssund. The name comes from the Danish-Norwegian King Christian VI who founded the town in 1742. The last element of the name, sund, means "strait". The old name of the town/village (originally the island Kirkelandet) was Fosna or Fosen which means "hiding place" (here 'hidden port'). It was also often named Lille Fosen ("the small Fosen") to distinguish it from the island Storfosna ("the big Fosen") in Ørland.

Before 1877, the name was spelled Christianssund, from 1877 to 1888 it was spelled Kristianssund, and since 1889 it has had its present spelling, Kristiansund.

Before the introduction of postal codes in Norway in 1968, it was easy to confuse the name Kristiansund with Kristiansand in the south. It was therefore obligatory to always add an N (for north) to Kristiansund (Kristiansund N) and an S (for south) to Kristiansand (Kristiansand S). This is pretty much still practiced and also occurs in some other contexts than postal addresses.

Coat of arms
The coat of arms was granted on 27 June 1742. The arms were granted by King Christian VI and are described as a silver or white river flowing from a cliff, with salmon jumping upwards on a blue background. The waterfall may possibly be the Lille Fosen waterfall near the town.

There are two myths as to why the arms show a waterfall. The first one is because the old name of the town (Fosen) was misinterpreted as Fossund (as a compound of foss which means waterfall and sund which means strait).

The other myth concerning the coat of arms is that there was a mix up, between Kristiansund's and Molde's intended shield. The Dano-Norwegian government officials in charge of the giving of the coats, had a party to remember the momentous occasion and became too drunk and hungover to remember which was which, and so Molde got the coat with a whale (which are scarce in between the Romsdal fjords) and Kristiansund got the waterfall (since Molde is on the mainland and Kristiansund lies in the open sea, it would be more likely that the waterfall was intended for Molde's mountains and the whales for Kristiansund.)

Churches
The Church of Norway has three parishes within the municipality of Kristiansund. It is part of the Ytre Nordmøre prosti (deanery) in the Diocese of Møre.

St. Eystein Catholic Church is the only Catholic church in Kristiansund.

Geography
The municipality borders Smøla Municipality and Aure Municipality to the northeast, Tingvoll Municipality to the east, Gjemnes Municipality to the south, and Averøy Municipality to the southwest. The small Grip archipelago is located in the northwestern part of the municipality. The municipality is surrounded by the Freifjorden and Kvernesfjorden with the open sea to the northwest.

Kristiansund is built on four main islands, with many smaller islands. The island of Nordlandet ("North Land", humorously nicknamed Marokko), is the second largest island and the site of the local airport, Kristiansund Airport, Kvernberget (IATA code: KSU). Kirkelandet, third in size is made up of two areas Kirkelandet and Gomalandet. In the local dialect, Kirkelandet (the "Church Land") is pronounced "Kirklandet", without the middle e. The smallest island is Innlandet ("Innermost Land"; humorously, "Tahiti"). The largest island in the municipality is Frei which was part of the old Frei Municipality which was merged into Kristiansund on 1 January 2008.

The islands of Grip, located northwest of Kristiansund are also a part of the municipality. Grip Municipality was Norway's smallest municipality, and also one of the most remote until it merged with Kristiansund in 1964. Today the island of Grip holds status as a deserted fishing village, but in the summer season it is a popular tourist attraction due to the very special location and architecture. Grip Stave Church, the second smallest stave church of Norway (Undredal Stave Church is smaller), is also located at Grip. It is also where Grip Lighthouse is located.

Kristiansund includes the town of Kristiansund which is one of the most densely populated cities of Norway, having what is arguably the country's most urban small city centre, due to the relatively small size of the islands on which it is built and the very constricted central harbour/town area of Kirkelandet.

History

8000 BC–1066
Archeological evidence exists of settlement in the area which is now Kristiansund from as early as 8000 BCE. At the end of the last ice age some areas at the western coast of Norway were ice-free. The first evidence of such settlements were discovered at Voldvatnet in Kristiansund in 1909. More have since been found, a discovery at Kvernberget in 2007 when archeological digs were conducted before the extension of the city's airport. Finds have also been discovered from the Bronze Age, and early Iron Age.

During the Viking era there were many battles around Kristiansund. The most famous one was the Battle of Rastarkalv on the island of Frei, where the Norwegian King Håkon the Good fought against the Eirikssønnene group. There is now a monument located near  at Nedre Frei, where the battle was fought.

Middle Ages

The island of Grip was an important fishing community during the Middle Ages, and was considered to be the most important municipality in the region at the time. The natural harbour in Lille-fosen, close to where Kristiansund is located today was also frequently used for fishing purposes.

17th to 18th century
During the 17th century a small settlement developed around the area we know today as Kristiansund harbour. As more and more settlers arrived, the area became an important trading port for fishing and the lumber transportation along the coast. The Dano-Norwegian government established a customs station here, which was controlled by the main trading port in Trondheim. In 1631, the port was declared to be a ladested.
  
Dutch sailors brought the knowledge of clipfish production to Kristiansund at the end of the 17th century, and for a number of years the town was the largest exporter of clipfish in Norway, exporting goods mainly to the Mediterranean countries as Spain and Portugal. The city's clipfish production was also part of the reason why it was given town status as a kjøpstad in 1742.

19th century to present

The town of Christianssund was established as the municipality of Christianssund on 1 January 1838 (see formannskapsdistrikt law). During the 1960s, there were many municipal mergers across Norway due to the work of the Schei Committee. On 1 January 1964, Kristiansund Municipality was merged with the tiny Grip Municipality (population: 104) to the northwest and the Dale area of Bremsnes Municipality on Nordlandet island (population: 963). The neighboring Frei Municipality was merged with Kristiansund on 1 January 2008 creating a much larger Kristiansund Municipality.

Media
The local newspaper of Kristiansund is Tidens Krav, which also functions as a semi-regional newspaper for the other municipalities located nearby the city.
Other online newspapers for the city exists, such as KSU.no. A local radio station, also named KSU 24/7, was founded in 2016.

Climate
Kristiansund has a temperate oceanic climate (Cfb) with cool-to-warm summers and mild winters. The city structure with the unique natural harbour of the city combined with Atlantic air from the southwest and the Gulf Stream gives Kristiansund a much warmer climate than its latitude would indicate. The all-time high  was set 28 July 2018. The warmest month on record at Kristiansund Airport was July 2014 with mean  and average daily high . The all-time low  was recorded 23 February 2010. The coldest month on record at Kristiansund Airport was December 2010 with mean  and average daily low . The coldest month recorded at earlier weather stations in Kristiansund was February 1947 with mean  (recordings since 1871).

Government
All municipalities in Norway, including Kristiansund, are responsible for primary education (through 10th grade), outpatient health services, senior citizen services, unemployment and other social services, zoning, economic development, and municipal roads. The municipality is governed by a municipal council of elected representatives, which in turn elect a mayor, and subcommittees for specific sectors of governance, such as education, public health and the Petroleum industry.  The municipality falls under the Møre og Romsdal District Court and the Frostating Court of Appeal.

Municipal council
The municipal council of Kristiansund is made up of 45 representatives that are elected to four-year terms. The party breakdown of the council is as follows:

Mayor
The mayors of Kristiansund (incomplete list):
2015–present: Kjell Neergaard (Ap)
2007-2015: Per Kristian Øyen (Ap)
1997-2007: Dagfinn Ripnes (H)
1995-1997: Aud Inger Aure (KrF)
1989-1995: Harald Martin Stokke (Ap)
1984-1989: Øivind Jensen (Ap)
1982-1983: Knut Engdahl (H)

Twin towns
Kirstiansund has sister city agreements with the following places:
 Kokkola, Finland
 Härnösand, Sweden
 Fredericia, Denmark

Together the three cities hold a tournament called Nordiske Dager ("Nordic Days").

Parks and gardens

Though fairly small in size, the city of Kristiansund contains many green parks and gardens, frequently used by the city's inhabitants. There are two larger parks near the city centre. The first one is located near Langveien, and was constructed in the aftermath of World War II . The second one is located in Vanndamman. This area used to be part of the city water supply, due to the large amount of small lakes in the area. (hence the name "Vanndamman" (The Water ponds)) The two parks are partly linked together, but the Langveien-park serve more as an urban recreation area due to the short walking distance from the city centre, while the Vanndamman-park is more suitable for outings and jogging.

Transport
Started in 1876 and still going strong is the Sundbåt ("Sound Boat"/"Strait Crossing Boat") shuttle service with a capacity of a few tens of passengers, travelling between the islands. The small motor ferry crosses the harbour from Kirkelandet to Innlandet, then goes on to Nordlandet, to Gomalandet, and back to Kirkelandet, repeating the round trip in half-hour intervals morning to evening on weekdays. The Sundbåt bears the distinction of being the world's oldest motorized regular public transport system in continuous service.

The road to Kristiansund from the mainland, Norwegian National Road 70 is connected to European route E39 by the bridge/tunnel system called Krifast. After passing through the underwater Freifjord Tunnel from the central part of Krifast, National Road 70 crosses Frei, and enters Kristiansund over the Omsund Bridge onto Nordlandet. The Nordsund Bridge brings the Rv 70 to Gomalandet and its terminus in downtown at Kirkelandet. Another high bridge, the Sørsund Bridge, leads from Kirkelandet to Innlandet. E39 leads southwest to the town of Molde and northeast via the European route E6 to Trøndelag and the city of Trondheim.

There used to be a car ferry going from Kirkelandet island to neighboring Averøy Municipality to the west, whose people have been commuting to town for many years for work as well as selling agricultural products. The ferry to Averøy connected Kristiansund to Norwegian National Road 64, which continued along the scenic Atlanterhavsvegen to Molde. Because both tunnels are forbidden for bicyclists, Kristiansund cannot easily be reached by bicycle.

A second car ferry goes from Seivika on Nordlandet to Tustna in the northeast (road: RV 680), with further road and ferry connections to the islands of Smøla and Hitra, and to Aure Municipality on the mainland.

Besides roads and car ferries and Kristiansund Airport, Kvernberget, connections to/from Kristiansund consist of the traditional coastal express Hurtigruten connecting coastal towns from Bergen in the south to Kirkenes in the north, and the high speed catamaran passenger service Kystekspressen to Trondheim. Another option to get to Kristiansund is to fly with Scandinavian Airlines from several other Norwegian cities.

Commerce and industry

Kristiansund is known as the major bacalhau city of Norway. Bacalhau is made of salted, dried codfish, and has traditionally been exported in large amounts to Spain, Portugal and Latin America as food suitable during Lent. In recent years Kristiansund has become the major oil and gas city at the mid-northwestern coast. Oil companies like Royal Dutch Shell and Statoil have offices in Kristiansund from where they serve their offshore installations at Haltenbanken (one of the northernmost underwater oil fields in the world).

Due to the city's heavy involvement in fish processing and international shipping, there used to be as many as seven consulates in Kristiansund, mainly to Latin countries. Currently, there are only five left: Britain, Finland, Latvia, the Netherlands, and Portugal.

Culture and sports
Kristiansund is an important cultural centre in the region of Nordmøre. The city is probably best known for housing one of Norway's oldest operas, which was established in 1928 by Edvard Bræin. There is an annual opera festival held every February in Kristiansund named The Opera Weeks (Operafestukene). In addition to this, Kristiansund is also host city of Northern Europes largest photo festival, Nordic Light. Even though this is a rather "young" festival, (Est. 2006) it has grown to become one of the most important of its kind in Europe, attracting famous photographers from all around the world, like Don McCullin, Jock Sturges and William Klein. Other smaller festivals held in Kristiansund include The Tahiti Festival and Kristiansund Church, Art and Culture Festival (shortened to the KKKK-festival in Norwegian).

Kristiansund's main football team, Kristiansund BK, is a result of the 2003 merger between the two largest football teams in the city, KFK and Clausenengen, which together with support from local businesses helped in creating a united elite club commitment. The club started at the 4th level (tredje divisjon) of the Norwegian football league system, and qualified for the 2017 season to play at the top level (Eliteserien). The team finished 7th in its first season at the top level, beating all expectation, and has since climbed upwards; Finishing 5th at the top level in 2020.

Other popular sports in Kristiansund include Volleyball, Wrestling, Swimming, Ice skating and Handball.

Tourist attractions

 The archipelago of Grip, northwest of Kristiansund was (until 1964) the smallest municipality of Norway. Today it is a deserted fishing village, but is a popular tourist attraction for the special architecture and unique location. Norway's smallest stave church, which was constructed in the end of the 15th century is also located at Grip.
 Sundbåtene in Kristiansund claims to be the world's oldest public transport system, founded in 1876. The small "Sundbåt" passenger ferries crosses between the four "lands" of the city.
 The old city structure in Vågen is a center for the historical fishing settlement in Kristiansund. Mellemværftet is also located here, which is an old shipbuilding facility for sailing ships. The Norwegian Clipfish Museum is also located here.
 Innlandet is an old city part of Kristiansund with very special and unique coastal architecture. Innlandet is the part of Kristiansund that was least damaged during the bombings of Kristiansund during World War II .
 Nordic Light is an annual festival of photography arranged for the first time in 2006, and is currently the largest of its kind in Northern Europe. The festival is represented by Morten Krogvold.
 Festiviteten (Kristiansund Opera) is the oldest opera house in Norway. It is built in Art Nouveau-style, and was completed in 1914. It is one of the few older buildings in the city centre of Kristiansund that survived the bombing of the city during World War II .
 Tahitifestivalen is an annual music festival that is arranged in Kristiansund. The festival is arranged by Frode Alnæs and the cafè Dødeladen on Innlandet. The festival was first introduced for the first time in 2000. There has been artist like Dance with a Stranger, Madcon, Hellbillies, Madrugada, Bigbang and many more.
Varden is an old lookout tower located 78 meters above sea level. At the top you get magnificent views to the shipping lane with the fishing village Grip on the horizon. The panorama goes 360 degrees with the Nordmøre mountains as a powerful backdrop. Open every day with free access where you can view the mountains and fjords of Nordmøre.

Notable residents

The following people are from, or have their roots in, Kristiansund.

The Arts 
 Edvard Bræin (1887-1957) an organist, composer, and orchestra conductor
 Arnulf Øverland (1889–1968) poet, wrote to inspire the Norwegian resistance movement
 Tordis Maurstad (1901–1997) a Norwegian stage actress 
 Ragnar Vold (1906–1967) a journalist, non-fiction writer and novelist
 Vera Zorina (1917–2003) ballerina, theatre and film actress, brought up in Kr'sund 
 Edvard Fliflet Bræin (1924–1976) a Norwegian composer and orchestra conductor
 Karsten Alnæs (born  1938) fiction and popular history writer (parents were from Kr'sund)
 Ingar Knudtsen (born  1944) fantasy & science fiction author, lives in Kr'sund
 Petter Schramm (1946-2014) a Norwegian poet, grew up in Kr'sund
 Øivind Elgenes (born 1958) a Norwegian vocalist, guitarist and composer
 Frode Alnæs (born  1959) singer, jazz guitarist, features with Dance with a Stranger 
 Dagfinn Koch (born 1964) musician, writes chamber music and for orchestra, opera and ballet
 Jan Erik Mikalsen (born 1979) Norwegian composer of contemporary classical music
 120 Days (2001–2012) rock band, formerly known as "The Beautiful People"

Public Service & business 

 Wilhelm Frimann Koren Christie (1778–1849) rep. at Norwegian Constituent Assembly
 John Moses (1781–1849) merchant and politician, rep. at Norwegian Constituent Assembly
 Georg Ulrich Wasmuth (1788–1814) military officer, rep. at Norwegian Constitutional Assembly
 Peter Christian Knudtzon (1789-1864) a Danish businessman and ship-owner
 Nicolai Hanson (1870–1899) a Norwegian zoologist and Antarctic explorer
 Wollert Krohn-Hansen (1889—1973) pastor, Bishop of Sør-Hålogaland, 1952-1959
 Kaare Fostervoll (1891–1981) DG of Norwegian Broadcasting Corporation, 1949 to 1962
 Niels Werring (1897–1990) a Norwegian ship-owner of Wilh. Wilhelmsen Holding ASA
 Sigurd Frisvold (born 1947) Army General, former Chief of Defence, 1999 to 2005

Sport 

 Ansgar Løvold (1888–1961) a wrestler, butcher and philanthropist
 Arne Gaupset (1894–1976) a sport wrestler, competed at the 1924 Summer Olympics
 Robert Gaupset (1906–1964) a wrestler, he competed at the 1928 Summer Olympics
 Ivar Stokke (1911–1993) a sport wrestler who competed in the 1936 Summer Olympics
 Babe Didrikson Zaharias (1914–1956), U.S. golfer, athlete and twice Olympic gold medalist; her father Ole came from Kr'sund
 Anders Giske (born  1959) footballer with 288 club caps and 38 for Norway
 Gøran Sørloth (born 1962) a former footballer with 250 club caps and 55 for Norway 
 Gudrun Høie (born  1970) amateur sport wrestler & four times world champion
 Anne Holten (born 1972) a Norwegian sport wrestler, twice world champion
 Øyvind Leonhardsen (born  1970) footballer with 402 club caps and 86 for Norway 
 Petter Rudi (born 1973) a retired footballer with 350 club caps and 46 for Norway,
 Ole Gunnar Solskjær (born  1973) footballer with 386 club caps and 67 for Norway, 
 Trond Andersen (born 1975) a former footballer, with 334 club caps and 38 for Norway 
 Jonny Hansen (born 1981) footballer

References

External links

Municipal fact sheet from Statistics Norway 
Some Photographs of a tour to Kristiansund in August 1986

 
Nordmøre
Municipalities of Møre og Romsdal
Populated coastal places in Norway
1838 establishments in Norway